Coleophora discopunctata is a moth of the family Coleophoridae, found in the Democratic Republic of Congo.

References

discopunctata
Moths described in 2005
Insects of the Democratic Republic of the Congo
Moths of Africa
Endemic fauna of the Democratic Republic of the Congo